Vishal Aditya Singh (born 25 January 1988), is an Indian actor and model who works in Hindi television.

Early life and career

Early life and modelling (2009)

Singh excelled in playing cricket at school and state tournaments. He began his career as a model, and after doing some modelling assignments, he came to Mumbai for pursuing his acting career.

Television debut and struggles (2010–2015)

Singh made his television acting debut in 2010 as the main lead Avdesh Thakur in Sagar Films production Jai Jai Shiv Shankar, a Bhojpuri serial on Mahuaa TV. His first Hindi TV role was in the historical drama Chandragupta Maurya in 2011 wherein he appeared as Shashank. From 2012 to 2013, Singh enacted the part of Veeru in Rashmi Sharma's popular series Sasural Simar Ka on Colors TV. In 2014, he played a cop in the comedy Bachchan Pandey ki Toli on Dhamaal Tv. In 2015, he essayed Devendra Singh Rana in mini series Time Machine on Epic TV.

Television success (2015–2018)

Singh achieved a turning point in his career, in March 2015 when he was cast the role of Lakhan Thakur/Shakti Thakur in the &TV show Begusarai, opposite Shivangi Joshi. He did an episodic in 2016 for Zing's Pyaar Tune Kya Kiya. In June 2017, Singh appeared in the lead role of King Veerendra Pratap Singh in Ekta Kapoor's fantasy TV series Chandrakanta broadcast on Colors TV. Later in 2018, he was seen in Gul Khan's musical show Kullfi Kumarr Bajewala on StarPlus as Singer Tevar Singh.

Reality shows (2019–present)

In July 2019, Singh joined as a celebrity contestant in the 9th season of dance drama Nach Baliye with Madhurima Tuli. The two became the second runner-up in the show. Just after the finale of Nach Baliye, he entered as a wild card participant in the 13th season of game reality TV show Bigg Boss. He was evicted on Day 127. In 2020, Singh also featured in two music videos— Dil Mein Hindustan (related to Independence Day) and Khwabeeda (along with Madhurima Tuli). In May 2021, he headed to Cape Town for shooting of his next reality show, the 11th season of stunt based adventure series Fear Factor: Khatron Ke Khiladi.

Personal life
Singh met actress Madhurima Tuli on the sets of Chandrakanta in 2017 and later dated her. They broke up after a year of dating in 2018.

Media 
Vishal Aditya Singh was ranked in The Times of India's Most Desirable Men On Television list at No. 13 in 2018, at No. 17 in 2019 and at No. 18 in 2020.

Filmography

Television

Music videos

References

External links
 

Living people
1989 births
People from Arrah
Male actors in Hindi television
Indian male television actors
21st-century Indian male actors
Male actors from Bihar
Fear Factor: Khatron Ke Khiladi participants